High School Musical 3: Senior Year Dance is a rhythm game based on the film High School Musical 3: Senior Year. The game was released on October 21, 2008 for the Wii and for PlayStation 2, Xbox 360 and Windows later that month.

Gameplay
 Dancing to favorite High School Musical songs from all three films.
 Players can play as familiar characters including Troy, Gabriella, Sharpay, Ryan, Chad, Taylor, Kelsi, and Zeke or create and customize a unique Wildcat.
 Engaging in competitive multiplayer dance-offs for a fun dance party experience.
 Earning points by learning dance moves from "High School Musical" characters to unlock songs, clothing and characters.
 Interaction with scenes by activating special effects.
 Xbox Live features, including in-game Achievements and ESPN Integration (Xbox 360 version only).

Songs

High School Musical

High School Musical 2

High School Musical 3: Senior Year

Reception

Reviews of the game range from mixed to negative, as both GameRankings and Metacritic gave it a score of 65% and 60/100 for the Wii version, 65% and 65/100 for the PlayStation 2 version, 46.67% and 55/100 for the Xbox 360 version, and 50% and 48/100 for the PC version. Variety gave the Wii version a mixed review and said: "Target kiddie audience will enjoy mixing-and-matching characters in ways never seen onscreen, as well as creating their own East High Wildcat, but will quickly get frustrated with the game's core "dancing" mechanic that's really just flailing with the Wii's wireless controller".

References

External links
 Official High School Musical 3: Senior Year Website
 High School Musical 3: Senior Year DANCE! at IGN
 High School Musical 3: Senior Year DANCE! at Xbox.com
High School Musical 3: Senior Year DANCE! at PlayStation.com

2008 video games
Senior Year DANCE!
Multiplayer and single-player video games
Page 44 Studios games
PlayStation 2 games
Video games developed in the United States
Wii games
Windows games
Xbox 360 games